Araeopteron is a genus of moths of the family Erebidae. The genus was erected by George Hampson in 1893.

Taxonomy
The genus has previously been classified in the subfamily Araeopteroninae within Erebidae or in the subfamily Acontiinae of the family Noctuidae.

Description
Palpi slender and sickle shaped, reaching just above the vertex of the head. Antennae almost simple. Thorax and abdomen smoothly scaled. Tibia naked. Forewings rather long and narrow. The apex rounded. Veins 3, 4 and 8, 9, 10, 11 stalked, whereas veins 6 arise from below angle of cell and vein 7 from angle. Hindwings with veins 3, 4 and 6, 7 stalked. Vein 5 from middle of discocellulars.

Species

References

 Dyar (1914). Proceedings of the United States National Museum 47: 184.
 Dyar (1916). Proceedings of the United States National Museum 51: 18.
 Hampson (1893). Illustrations of Typical Specimens of Lepidoptera Heterocera in the Collection of the British Museum 9: 33.
 Hampson (1907). Journal of the Bombay Natural History Society 17: 670–672.
 Hampson (1910). Catalogue of the Lepidoptera Phalaenae in the British Museum 10: 22, fig. 9.
 Hampson (1910). Catalogue of the Lepidoptera Phalaenae in the British Museum 10: 27.
 Hampson (1910). Catalogue of the Lepidoptera Phalaenae in the British Museum 10: 29. pl. 149: 19.
 Hampson. Annals and Magazine of Natural History 8(13): 167.
Han HL, Kononenko VS (2021) Three new species of the genus Araeopteron Hampson, 1893 (Lepidoptera, Erebidae, Boletobiinae) from the Xizang Autonomous Region, China with an updated list of the world species. ZooKeys 1060: 17-32.
 Fibiger, M. (2002). Heterocera Sumatrana 12(3): 129.
 Fibiger, M. & Hacker, H.H. (2001). Esperiana Buchreie zur Entomologie 8: 1–944.
 Fibiger, M. & Kononenko, V. (2008). "A revision of the subfamily Araeopteroninae Fibiger, 2005 in the Russian Far East and neighbouring countries with a description of four new species (Lepidoptera, Noctuidae)." Zootaxa 1891: 39–54.
 Freyer (1912). Transactions of the Linnean Society of London (Zool) 15(1): 11.
 Inoue (1958). Tinea 4: 229–230.
 Inoue (1965). Tinea 7: 81.
 Joanis (1910). Bulletin de la Société Entomologique de France 1910: 201.
 Meyrick (1902). Transactions of the Entomological Society of London 35: 36.
 Schaus (1911). Annals and Magazine of Natural History 8(8): 108
 Turner (1902). Proceedings of the Linnean Society of New South Wales 27: 132–133.
 Turner (1910). Catalogue of the Lepidoptera Phalaenae in the British Museum 10: 27.
 Turner (1920). Transactions and Proceedings of the Royal Society of South Australia 44: 161.
 Turner (1925). Transactions and Proceedings of the Royal Society of South Australia 44: 39.
 Turner (1933). Transactions and Proceedings of the Royal Society of South Australia 57: 161.
 Walker (1866). Illustrations of Typical specimens of Lepidoptera Heterocera in the Collection of the British Museum 34: 1318.

Boletobiinae
Noctuoidea genera